Julien Jeanpierre was the defending champion, but did not compete this year.Danish first seed Kristian Pless won the title, defeating Russian ninth seed Mikhail Youzhny in the final, 6–4, 6–3.

Seeds

Draw

Finals

Top half

Section 1

Section 2

Bottom half

Section 3

Section 4

Notes

External links
 

Boys' Singles
Australian Open, 1999 Boys' Singles